Bobby Bailey may refer to:

Bobby Ray Bailey, fictional character in Sweet Home Alabama
Bobby Bailey, fictional character in Where East Is East

See also
Bob Bailey (disambiguation)